Mathias Kristensen (born 24 June 1993) is a Danish professional footballer who plays as a forward for Danish Superliga club Lyngby Boldklub.

Career

Club career
In December 2017, Kristensen signed with AC Horsens after scoring 58 goals in three seasons for Tarup-Paarup in the Denmark Series. He left the club again in December 2018.

On 15 February 2019, Kristensen signed with Nykøbing FC for the rest of the season. After an excellent season in Nykøbing, where the 28-year-old striker was top scorer in the Danish 1st Division and also voted Player of the Year by Spillerforeningen, it was confirmed on 2 June 2022, that Kristensen had joined newly promoted Danish Superliga club Lyngby Boldklub, signing a deal until June 2025.

References

External links

Danish men's footballers
1993 births
Living people
Tarup-Paarup IF players
AC Horsens players
Nykøbing FC players
Lyngby Boldklub players
Danish Superliga players
Danish 1st Division players
Association football forwards
People from Assens Municipality
Sportspeople from the Region of Southern Denmark